Bruce Chun (born February 6, 1963, in Mexico City, Mexico) is a Canadian cinematographer.

Chun was born to a Chinese Mexican family. He won (along with Jean-Pierre St. Louis) the 2002 Prix Gémeaux in the category of Best Cinematography - Dramatic for the La vie, La vie episode 150 degrés à l'ombre and earned nominations for the Genie Award for Best Achievement in Cinematography in 2007 for his work on Bon Cop, Bad Cop and in 2008 for Nitro. Chun is a member of the Canadian Society of Cinematographers.

External links
 
 Canadian Society of Cinematographers profile (scroll down)

1963 births
Canadian cinematographers
Canadian people of Chinese descent
Best Cinematography Genie and Canadian Screen Award winners
Living people
Mexican emigrants to Canada
Mexican people of Chinese descent
People from Mexico City
People from Montreal